Timo Meier (born 8 October 1996) is a Swiss professional ice hockey player for the New Jersey Devils of the National Hockey League (NHL). After being selected ninth overall by the San Jose Sharks in the 2015 NHL Entry Draft, Meier became the third Swiss player in franchise history to be drafted by the team.

Growing up in Herisau, Switzerland, Meier began playing ice hockey at a young age. At the age of 15, he accepted an apprenticeship position with the SC Rapperswil-Jona Lakers, a National A League team in Switzerland, where he observed and learned from David Aebischer and Jason Spezza. After completing the 2012–13 season in his native Switzerland with the U17 SC Rapperswil-Jona Lakers, Meier was selected 12th overall by the Halifax Mooseheads in the 2013 Canadian Hockey League Import Draft. Meier spent three seasons with the Mooseheads before being traded to the Rouyn–Noranda Huskies to complete his major junior ice hockey career.

Despite impressing the Sharks' coaching staff during their 2016 training camp, an illness held off Meier's NHL debut until 16 December. Following his NHL debut, Meier remained in the Sharks' lineup and he continued to impress the Sharks' coaching staff with his play. On 17 January 2022, Meier became the first player in Sharks franchise history to score five goals in one game.

Internationally, Meier has played for the Swiss national team at two World Championships, winning a silver medal in 2018.

Early life
Meier was born on 8 October 1996 in Herisau, Switzerland, to parents Claudia and Charly. As the youngest of two, Meier grew up playing ice hockey and described himself as passionate about hockey from a young age. At the age of 15, Meier accepted an apprenticeship position with the SC Rapperswil-Jona Lakers, a National A League team in Switzerland, where he observed and learned from David Aebischer and Jason Spezza.

Playing career

Major junior
In the 2012–13 season, Meier played in his native Switzerland at the Elite Jr. A level with the U17 SC Rapperswil-Jona Lakers. His play with the Lakers earned him international attention and he was selected 12th overall by the Halifax Mooseheads in the 2013 Canadian Hockey League (CHL) Import Draft. Upon being drafted, he was expected to be one of the Mooseheads' core members alongside Danish player Nikolaj Ehlers. However, he later reflected that playing in the CHL was different than in Switzerland as he was competing against older players and had to play a more physical game. In his rookie season, he tallied 17 goals and 17 assists for 34 points through 66 games. 

Following his rookie season, Meier returned to Switzerland and trained with former professional ice hockey player Sandro Bertaggia. Meier improved offensively in his sophomore year, winning the Mike Bossy Trophy as the QMJHL Best Professional Prospect and being named to the QMJHL Second All-Star Team. During the season, he maintained a 27-game point streak between 2 November and 26 February where he tallied 51 points. His career-best 44 goals and 46 assists for 90 points through 61 games, earned him significant attention from hockey scouts leading up to the 2015 NHL Entry Draft. Leading up to the 2015 Draft, Meier was ranked 12th amongst draft eligible players by Bob McKenzie of The Sports Network. Meier was eventually drafted in the first round, ninth overall, by the San Jose Sharks, becoming the third Swiss player ever drafted by the Sharks. He was shortly thereafter invited to the Sharks' 2015 Development Camp and signed a three-year entry level contract.

After signing his entry-level contract, Meier returned to the Mooseheads for the 2015–16 season where he was named team captain a few weeks before the start of the season. During his short time as captain, Meier accumulated 11 goals and 25 assists for 36 points through 23 games. On 6 January 2016, Meier was traded to the Rouyn-Noranda Huskies in exchange for a first round pick in 2017, second round pick in 2017 and a fourth round pick in 2018. As a member of the Huskies, Meier helped them qualify for the playoffs as they finished the 2015–16 QMJHL regular season with the best record in the league. During the Huskies first-round sweep against the Drummondville Voltigeurs, Meier recorded 13 points in four games including a hat-trick and two assists in the eventual 7–3 win of Game Four. Meier finished the QMJHL playoffs with 11 goals and 23 points through 18 games to help the Huskies clinch the President Cup as QMJHL champions.

San Jose Sharks

Despite impressing the Shark's coaching staff during training camp, an illness held off Meier's NHL debut for the start of the 2016–17 season. After missing nearly a month due to mononucleosis, Meier was assigned to the Sharks' American Hockey League (AHL) affiliate, the San Jose Barracuda, on 26 October 2016. In the AHL, Meier continued to produce at the same pace he had in the QMJHL by accumulating 15 points through 17 games by mid-December. By December, he also maintained a four-game point streak as he led the Barracuda in goals and ranked second in points. After he scored four goals in two games with the Barracuda in early December, the Sharks intended to recall Meier to the NHL level on 7 December before he fell ill. Upon recovering from his illness, Meier was recalled to the NHL level on 15 December and he made his NHL debut the following day against the Montreal Canadiens. During the 4–2 win, Meier played alongside Joonas Donskoi and Chris Tierney as he scored his first career NHL goal against Carey Price in the first period.

Following his NHL debut, Meier remained in the Sharks' lineup and he continued to impress the Sharks' coaching staff with his play. During a 2–1 overtime loss against the Los Angeles Kings on 3 January 2017, Meier played on the top line with Joe Thornton and Joe Pavelski as he recorded a game-high seven hits and two shots on goal in 13:59 of ice time. Shortly after this game, Meier suffered an upper-body injury causing him to be scratched for the first time since joining the Sharks. He was re-assigned to the AHL level various times but was quickly recalled each time. After the Sharks finished the season in third place in the Pacific Division, Meier competed in five games against the Edmonton Oilers during the 2017 Stanley Cup playoffs. In Game 1, Meier put three shots on goal, managed a takeaway, and skated 10:35 of ice time in an eventual 3–2 overtime win. Once the Sharks were eliminated from playoff contention, Meier was re-assigned to the AHL where he helped the Barracuda advance to the Western Conference Finals. 

Following his rookie season, Meier became a mainstay in the Sharks lineup and played in 81 games of the 2017–18 season. Although he finished the season with 36 points, he tallied only three goals in his first 28 games and was a healthy scratch in late October. In November 2017, Meier was fined $2,403.67 for striking Vancouver Canucks defenceman Michael Del Zotto in the face with his stick during San Jose's 5–0 win. Meier's offensive abilities sparked in late December as he scored five goals in eight games between 14 December and 2 January. He continued to produce in January as he scored three goals in four games later on in the month. His scoring prowess helped the Sharks qualify for the 2018 Stanley Cup playoffs, where they met the Anaheim Ducks in the first round. In the Sharks' first-round sweep of the Ducks, Meier tallied three points in four games but only managed one goal and an assist in six games against Vegas. Once the Sharks were eliminated, Meier joined Switzerland men's national ice hockey team at the 2018 IIHF World Championship.

After winning a silver medal with Team Switzerland, Meier returned to the Sharks for the 2018–19 season. As a result of the acquisition of Erik Karlsson during the offseason, and his impressive play during the 2017–18 season, Meier began the campaign on the Sharks' second line alongside Logan Couture and Tomas Hertl. He began the season strong by maintaining a career-high nine-game point streak, which also included a five-game goal-scoring streak from 9 to 30 October. Meier subsequently became the second youngest in franchise history to register a point streak of nine games or more. His point streak ended in a 4–1 loss to the Columbus Blue Jackets on 1 November 2018. By the end of October, Meier led the Sharks in goals, plus/minus, power-play goals, and finished second in points and shots. Within the next month, he continued to produce offensively and he continued to lead the team with 18 goals and 14 assists for 32 points. Five of those 18 goals came during a four game period after he missed three with an upper-body injury. Meier's production helped the Sharks maintain an 18–11–5 record to tie them for second place in the Pacific Division behind the Calgary Flames by mid-December. 

When the Sharks qualified for the 2019 Stanley Cup playoffs in March, Meier was one of five Sharks players who had tallied at least 24 goals. In the same month, he was fined $2,000 for embellishment after an incident involving Roman Josi during a game against the Nashville Predators. The fine came after he was warned for the same issue during a game against the Winnipeg Jets in February. Meier concluded the 2018–19 regular season with a career-best 30 goals and 36 assists for 66 points through 78 games. He finished tied-for-third on the Sharks in goals, fourth in points, sixth in assists, tied for fourth in power-play goals, and third in shots. Although Meier sat out the Sharks' final game of the season with an undisclosed injury, he was expected to be ready for the playoffs. In Game 1 of the Western Conference Final against the St. Louis Blues, Meier recorded two goals and an assist in the 6–3 win. He finished the playoffs with five goals and 10 assists for 15 points through 20 games. As a result of his breakout season, Meier signed a four-year contract extension on 1 July to remain with the Sharks.

Following the departure of Joe Pavelski during the 2019–20 offseason, Meier was expected to replace him on the Sharks' first power-play unit and become a bigger presence on the penalty kill. The Sharks opened the season with four straight losses before winning three consecutive contests as Meier played in his 200th NHL game on 16 October. After going scoreless in five straight games, Meier scored his first career NHL hat-trick on 28 December 2019, in a 6–1 win over the Philadelphia Flyers. When the season was paused due to the COVID-19 pandemic, Meier led all San Jose skaters in points, was second in goals, third in assists, and tied for fourth in power-play points. He was subsequently voted the 2019–20 "Sharks Player of the Year" for the first time.

When the NHL resumed for their shortened 2020–21 season, Meier began playing on the Sharks' second line as a winger for Ryan Donato and Hertl. Due to the shortened season, the Sharks began by playing eight road games over 15 days and their poor performance placed them last in the Honda West Division by early February. Although his offensive ability lessened during the season, Meier was one of five Sharks players to score 10 or more goals during the campaign. As a result of their lack of scoring depth and goaltending issues, the Sharks failed to qualify for the 2021 Stanley Cup playoffs. 

After failing to qualify for the Stanley Cup playoffs the previous two seasons, Meier and the Sharks began the 2021–22 season with four straight wins. Shortly after ending their win streak, Meier and teammate Kevin Labanc were placed on the NHL's COVID-19 protocol list on 2 November. While Meier and six other players were recovering, the Sharks went 3–3–0 in their absence for a 7–5–1 overall record. Upon returning to the Sharks lineup, Meier maintained a three-game point streak which included four goals and two assists. On 16 December, Meier became the fourth Shark in franchise history to register at least 29 points in 25 games and the first since Joe Thornton in 2010. 

By early January 2022, Meier led all Sharks players in assists and points while ranking second in goals. Across the league, he was tied for ninth in points while also setting a new career-high 1.22 points-per-game. His play during the first part of the season earned him a selection to the 2022 All-Star Game. Four days after the selection, he became the first player in Sharks franchise history to score five goals in one game, in a 6–2 win over the Los Angeles Kings. Following the five-goal game, Meier scored once more in a 3–2 loss to the Seattle Kraken and was subsequently named one of the NHL's three stars of the week.

New Jersey Devils
On 26 February 2023, Meier was traded to the New Jersey Devils in a multi-player trade.

Career statistics

Regular season and playoffs

International

Awards and honours

References

External links
 

1996 births
Living people
Expatriate ice hockey players in Canada
Expatriate ice hockey players in the United States
Halifax Mooseheads players
National Hockey League first-round draft picks
New Jersey Devils players
People from Frauenfeld District
Rouyn-Noranda Huskies players
San Jose Barracuda players
San Jose Sharks draft picks
San Jose Sharks players
Sportspeople from Thurgau
Swiss expatriate ice hockey people
Swiss expatriate sportspeople in Canada
Swiss expatriate sportspeople in the United States
Swiss ice hockey right wingers